The Westminster Foundation for Democracy (WFD) is a United Kingdom non-departmental public body set up to support democratic institutions overseas. It was established on 26 February 1992 and registered as a company limited by guarantee in the UK. It receives funding from the Foreign and Commonwealth Office (FCO) and the Department for International Development (DFID), which were merged into the Foreign, Commonwealth, and Development Office (FCDO) in September 2020.

Gloucester MP Richard Graham is the organisation's current chair of the board while former UK diplomat Anthony Smith serves as CEO since August 2014.

History 
Established on 26 February 1992, not long after the fall of the Berlin wall, WFD initially focused on providing support to political parties in Eastern European countries as they transition to democracy. By the 2000s, WFD became well known as an organisation with specialty in strengthening parliamentary capacity through their programmes.

Objectives 
WFD works to achieve sustainable political change in emerging democracies. Working with and through partner organisations, WFD seeks to strengthen the institutions of democracy through capacity building initiatives, technical support, and research projects that involve principally political parties (through the work of the UK political parties), parliaments, and the range of institutions that make up civil society, which includes non-governmental organisations (NGOs), trade unions, and the free press, among others.

Funding 
In 2016, WFD had a budget of about £7 million, of which about £2.5 million was spent through the major UK political parties. WFD accounts are presented to the UK parliament annually. In 2021, its budget had doubled to over £14 million which included funds received from the FCDO, the Conflict, Stability and Security Fund (CSSF), the European Union (EU), and others.

Offices 
WFD is headquartered in London, United Kingdom. As of September 2021, WFD operates in 25 countries grouped into several regional groupings: Asia, Europe & Central Asia, Middle East & North Africa, Sub-Saharan Africa, and Latin America.

Asia-Pacific (8)
 Indonesia
 Laos
 Malaysia
 Maldives
 Nepal
 Pakistan
 Philippines (Bangsamoro)
 Solomon Islands
 Sri Lanka

Europe & Central Asia (7)
 Albania
 Georgia
 Kyrgyz Republic
 Montenegro
 North Macedonia
 Serbia
 Ukraine

Middle East & North Africa (5)
 Algeria
 Lebanon
 Morocco
 Sudan
 Tunisia

Sub-Saharan Africa (5)
 Gambia
 Kenya
 Nigeria
 Sierra Leone
 Uganda

Latin America (1)
 Venezuela

The following are countries where the WFD had previously established a programme and/or a country office but had since been closed down:
 Armenia
Democratic Republic of the Congo
Ghana
Jordan
Kosovo
Myanmar
Mozambique
Uzbekistan

See also

National Endowment for Democracy, a similar organisation based in the United States
Electoral Reform Society, an organisation seeking improvement in UK democracy
Conflict, Stability and Security Fund, a similar organisation established by the UK government

References

External links

Foreign relations of the United Kingdom
Foreign, Commonwealth and Development Office
Non-departmental public bodies of the United Kingdom government
1992 establishments in the United Kingdom